is a private university  in Asakita, Hiroshima, Japan. The predecessor of the school was founded in 1948 by Miki Takeda. It was chartered as a junior women's college in 1962 and became a four-year college in 1966. In 2019, the university became fully coeducational.

The university has two faculties consisting of six departments:

Faculty of Education: 
 Primary Education Department
 Secondary Education Department

Faculty of Human Services:
 Welfare Department
 Psychology Department
 Nutrition Department
 Global Communication Department

In addition, the university has the Bunkyo English Communication Center (BECC), which operates in cooperation with all departments. The BECC arranges all native-speaker English courses and houses the Self-Access Learning Center (SALC), with Learning Advisors and administrative staff to support student English skill development.

External links
 Official website 

Educational institutions established in 1948
Private universities and colleges in Japan
Universities and colleges in Hiroshima Prefecture
1948 establishments in Japan